The Power of Silence is a 1928 American silent mystery drama film directed by Wallace Worsley and starring Belle Bennett, Ena Gregory and Anders Randolf. It was produced and distributed by Tiffany Pictures, one of the leading independent studios.

Synopsis
Mamie Stone is charged with the murder of Jim Wright, with whom she had a son Donald, on circumstantial evidence. She refuses to speak out in her defence and is in fact concealing identity of the true killer, Wright's wife Gloria.

Cast
 Belle Bennett as Mamie Stone
 John Westwood as 	Donald Stone
 Ena Gregory as Gloria Wright 
 Anders Randolf as 	District Attorney
 John St. Polis as 	Defense Attorney
 Virginia Pearson as Mrs. Wright
 Raymond Keane as Jim Wright
 Jack Singleton as 	Hotel Clerk

References

Bibliography
 Connelly, Robert B. The Silents: Silent Feature Films, 1910-36, Volume 40, Issue 2. December Press, 1998.
 Munden, Kenneth White. The American Film Institute Catalog of Motion Pictures Produced in the United States, Part 1. University of California Press, 1997.

External links
 

1928 films
1928 mystery films
American silent feature films
American mystery films
American black-and-white films
Films directed by Wallace Worsley
Tiffany Pictures films
1920s American films
Silent mystery films